Sol C. Johnson High School, known as Johnson High School, is a public high school located in  Savannah, Georgia, United States. A unit of the Savannah-Chatham County School System, it has been ranked number 819 among Newsweek magazine's top 1,500 U.S. secondary schools based on advanced placement and International Baccalaureate test scores. According to the Savannah Morning News, Johnson High students have been "taking strides forward" in their recent performance on the statewide Georgia High School Graduation Test.

Johnson High was named in the "America’s Best High Schools 2010" edition of Newsweek.

History
Johnson High was originally named Powell Laboratory School when it opened on Savannah's eastside in 1959. With an enrollment of approximately 1,000 students, it consisted of grades nine through twelve and was administered by Savannah State College (now Savannah State University). In 1960 the school was renamed after Sol C. Johnson, a prominent local journalist, philanthropist, educator, and founder of the Savannah Tribune, the nation's oldest newspaper catering to African-Americans.

Academics
Academic programs at Johnson High include the ninth-grade academy and the International Baccalaureate. Like most large high schools, Johnson includes a range of special education and advanced placement courses.

Student activities

Clubs and organizations
 Future Business Leaders of America
 National Junior Classical League
 National Honor Society
 NJROTC
 Flag Team
 Spanish Club
 Mock Trial
 Jobs for Georgia Graduates
 Foreign Media Studies Club
Danceline
Majorette

Notable alumni
Raphael Warnock, pastor and U.S. senator

References

External links

Savannah-Chatham County Public School System website

Public high schools in Georgia (U.S. state)
Educational institutions established in 1956
Schools in Savannah, Georgia
1956 establishments in Georgia (U.S. state)